Aimé Bazin (1904-1984) was a French art director. He was educated at the École nationale supérieure des Beaux-Arts before entering the film industry. He worked on more than forty productions during his career.

Selected filmography
 The Red Robe (1933)
 The Uncle from Peking (1934)
 Crime and Punishment (1935)
 Second Bureau (1935)
 The Silent Battle (1937)
 Fort Dolorès (1939)
 Mystery in Shanghai (1950)
 Moumou (1951)
 Operation Magali (1953)

References

Bibliography
 Andrews, Dudley. Mists of Regret: Culture and Sensibility in Classic French Film. Princeton University Press, 1995.

External links

1904 births
1984 deaths
French art directors
Film people from Paris